Hatipara is a village in Kamrup rural district, situated on the bank of river Brahmaputra.

Transport
The village is situated near National Highway 37 and connected to nearby towns and cities with regular buses and other modes of transportation.

References

Villages in Kamrup district